foundered, wrecked, grounded, or otherwise lost during 1840.

January

February

March

April

May

June

July

August

September

October

November

December

Unknown date

References

1840